Nicolai Groß (born 3 February 1990) is a German footballer who plays as a striker for FC Astoria Walldorf.

Career

Groß began his career with Astoria Walldorf before joining 1899 Hoffenheim in January 2011. He spent eighteen months playing for the reserve team, and had a successful 2011–12 season, scoring 14 goals. In July 2012 he signed for 1. FC Heidenheim of the 3. Liga, and made his debut on the second day of the season, as a substitute for Dennis Malura in a 4–0 win over Rot-Weiss Erfurt. After half a season with Heidenheim, he joined Stuttgarter Kickers on a six-month loan in January 2013 before being released by Heidenheim at the end of the loan. He returned to FC Astoria Walldorf shortly afterwards and helped them earn promotion to the Regionalliga Südwest shortly afterwards.

External links

1990 births
Living people
German footballers
TSG 1899 Hoffenheim II players
1. FC Heidenheim players
Stuttgarter Kickers players
3. Liga players
Regionalliga players
Footballers from Karlsruhe
FC Astoria Walldorf players
Association football forwards
21st-century German people